Aleksandr Prokhorov is a male personal name of Russian origin may refer to:
 Alexander Prokhorov (1916–2002), Soviet physicist
 Aleksandr Prokhorov (footballer) (1946–2005), Soviet international footballer
 Aleksandr Prokhorov (politician) (born 1953), Russian politician, governor of Smolensk Oblast
 Aleksandr Prokhorov (racewalker) (born 1986), Russian racewalking athlete and runner-up at the 2003 European Race Walking Cup